Oh Ji-ho (born April 14, 1976) is a South Korean actor. He is best known for the television dramas Couple or Trouble (2006), The Slave Hunters (2010), Queen of the Office (2013) and My Fair Lady (2016).

Career
Oh was born and raised in Mokpo, South Jeolla Province. He dropped out of his e-Business Management course at Anyang Industrial Technical School and at the age of 22, moved to Seoul on his own to pursue a career in acting. He first found work as a commercial model, then made his acting debut in 1998 with a minor role in the film Kka (Naked Being).

Despite starring in a few movies (notably the erotic two-hander La Belle in 2000), Oh would become better known for his work in television. He soon earned heartthrob status among fans for his handsome face and well-defined muscles, but critics initially dismissed him as just another model-turned-actor with attractive looks but little talent. In 2004, Oh established his acting credentials in A Second Proposal, about a divorcee getting another chance at love; he won Best Supporting Actor at the KBS Drama Awards. He next starred in Couple or Trouble (2006), a Hong sisters-penned romantic comedy series inspired by Overboard about a handyman who gets his petty revenge on an amnesiac heiress by lying to her that she's his live-in girlfriend so that she'll help take care of his three nephews. Couple or Trouble received high ratings and praise for its stars' acting, and Oh took home two popularity prizes at the MBC Drama Awards.

This was followed by more leading roles in Autumn Shower (2005) as a man who falls for the best friend of his comatose wife, Get Karl! Oh Soo-jung (2007) as a pro-golfer who wants to get back at the ex-girlfriend who dumped him when he was overweight and unsuccessful, and Single Dad in Love (2008) as a mixed martial arts fighter whose young son has been diagnosed with a brain tumor; but these series drew lackluster ratings.

In 2009, he played a smart yet socially inept underperformer whose wife will do anything to help him climb the corporate ladder in Queen of Housewives; despite being outshined by his other costars, Oh proved his willingness to look foolish in the service of comedy (similar to his turn in the 2005 series Super Rookie). Oh then reunited with Single Dad in Love television director Kwak Jung-hwan in his most high-profile, critically acclaimed series yet: historical drama The Slave Hunters (2010). Using his physicality to great effect, Oh portrayed a Joseon military general who becomes a runaway slave and his performance garnered him an Excellence Award at the 2010 KBS Drama Awards.

In 2011, Oh was cast in a supporting role in Sector 7, a 3D action film about a creature lurking on an oil rig, then appeared in the Korea-China-Japan co-production Strangers 6 and medical drama The Third Hospital (both in 2012). He also played ousted guard Baek Dong-soo in The Grand Heist, a Joseon-set comedy heist film about the theft of ice blocks from the royal storage.

Oh next starred in Queen of the Office (2013), a workplace dramedy adapted from Japanese television drama Haken no Hinkaku that addresses the plight of temps, followed by paranormal police procedural Cheo Yong (2014) as the titular ghost-seeing detective, and period drama More Than a Maid (2015) where he played a mysterious slave on an undercover assignment. He then played an obstetrician/gynecologist with impotence problems in the adult romantic comedy film Love Clinic (2015).

Personal life 
On January 9, 2007, Oh's ex-girlfriend, a bar hostess identified only by her surname Lim and bar name "Anna," killed herself shortly after they broke up. Oh said although he loved her, Lim was the one who ended their two year relationship because she didn't want to get in the way of his career. Lim's bereaved family and friends, however, insisted that Oh broke up with her on January 3, and the hurt drove her to suicide. A TV program later interviewed Lim's relatives and with their permission, entered her bedroom, and some of Oh's personal items were shown on camera, such as his screenplay and photos. After the show was aired, the TV station was severely criticized by the public for compromising the privacy of the people involved.

Oh married Eun Bo-ah on April 12, 2014 at the Shilla Hotel. Eun works in the fashion industry. They welcomed their first child, a daughter named Oh Seo-heun (nicknamed "Jibong"), on Dec 30, 2015.  Both he and his daughter have been cast members of reality program The Return of Superman since 2016. They welcomed their second child, a son, on August 18, 2018.

Filmography

Film

Television series

Variety show

Music video

Discography

Awards and nominations

References

External links 

 
 
 Oh Ji-ho at Heavenly Star Contents
 
 
 

South Korean male television actors
South Korean male film actors
21st-century South Korean male actors
South Korean male models
1976 births
Living people